"Plowed" is a song by American rock band Sponge. The song was released in 1994 as the second single from the group's debut studio album Rotting Piñata. "Plowed" is also featured on the band's compilation albums Molly and Hits & B Sides, Volume One, and was re-recorded for Hits & B Sides, Volume Two and for their 2021 album, Lavatorium.

Release and reception
"Plowed" is the band's first and highest-charting song to appear on the U.S. Billboard Hot 100 singles chart, having peaked at number 41. It is the band's second highest-charting song on the Modern Rock Tracks chart, where it reached number 5. The song also reached number 9 on the Mainstream Rock Tracks chart.

Music video
The music video for "Plowed" was released in 1994 and was directed by Tony Kunewalder. It revolves  around several people in their homes seemingly going about their daily lives while a large and ominous tornado is seen nearby, along with footage of the band performing. There is also an alternate version of the video that does not include the narrative scenes, and instead contains additional and alternate footage of the band performing.

Track listings
Maxi single

7" single

Charts

Use in pop culture
The song is featured in the 1995 film Empire Records, but is not present on the film's soundtrack. 
The song is also featured in the 1998 film No Looking Back. 
The song is featured in the TV show Cold Case, in the episode titled "Stand Up and Holler" (season 4, episode 20). 
The song is featured in the 2010 video game Tony Hawk: Shred.
A re-recorded version of "Plowed" is featured in the 2010 video game Guitar Hero: Warriors of Rock as a downloadable song.
The song is featured in the 2012 film Chasing Mavericks, and is also included on the film's soundtrack.

Cover versions
The melodic hardcore/metalcore band Evergreen Terrace covered the song in 2004 for their album Writer's Block.

Personnel
 Vinnie Dombroski – lead vocals
 Joey Mazzola – guitar, backing vocals
 Mike Cross – guitar
 Tim Cross – bass
 Jimmy Paluzzi – drums

References

1994 songs
1994 singles
Sponge (band) songs
Columbia Records singles